Khlong Khlung is a district (amphoe) in the central part of Kamphaeng Phet province, central Thailand.

Geography
Neighbouring districts are (from the north clockwise): Mueang Kamphaeng Phet, Sai Thong Watthana, Bueng Samakkhi, Khanu Woralaksaburi, Pang Sila Thong and Khlong Lan of Kamphaeng Phet Province.

History
The district Khanu was renamed Khlong Khlung in 1939.

Administration
The district is divided into 10 subdistricts (tambons), which are further subdivided into 101 villages (mubans). There are three townships (thesaban tambons): Khlong Khlung, Tha Makhuea, and Tha Phutsa. Each cover parts of the same-named tambon. There are a further 10 tambon administrative organizations (TAO).

Missing numbers are tambon which now form districts Sai Thong Watthana and Pang Sila Thong.

References

External links
amphoe.com

Khlong Khlung